Songjiang, from the Chinese for "Pine River" and formerly romanized as Sungkiang, usually refers to one of the following areas within the municipal limits of Shanghai:

 Songjiang Town, the former principal town of the Shanghai area
 Songjiang District, the present suburban district of Shanghai around Songjiang
 Songjiang Prefecture, the area of Jiangsu province administering much of Shanghai under imperial China
 Songjiang Special Administration District, the historic district of the Republic of China administering much of Shanghai
 Songjiang County, a former name of the present Songjiang District

It may also refer to the following locations in China:

 Songjiang Province a former province located within present-day Heilongjiang
 Songjiang in Hengnan County, Hunan
 Songjiang in Antu County, Jilin
 Songjiang in Jiaohe, Jilin
 Songjiang, in Dongfeng District, Jiamusi, Heilongjiang
 Songjiang, in Fusong County, Jilin

See also
 Song Jiang for the real and legendary Chinese bandit and revolt leader
 Matsue, for the Japanese city written with the same Chinese characters